(NACT) is a museum in Roppongi, Minato, Tokyo, Japan. A joint project of the Agency for Cultural Affairs and the National Museums Independent Administrative Institution, it stands on a site formerly occupied by a research facility of the University of Tokyo.

The building has been designed by Kisho Kurokawa. It is one of the largest exhibition spaces in the country. Access is from Nogizaka Station on the Tokyo Metro Chiyoda Line.
 
Unlike Japan's other national art museums, NACT is an 'empty museum', without a collection, permanent display, and curators. Like Kunsthalle in German-speaking regions, it accommodates temporary exhibitions sponsored and curated by other organizations. The policy has been successful. In its first fiscal year in 2007, it had 69 exhibitions organized by arts groups and 10 organized by NACT. Its Monet exhibition, held between 7 April and 2 July 2007, was the second most visited exhibition of the year, not only in Japan but in the world.

Its graphic visual identity was developed by graphic designer Kashiwa Sato of Tokyo-based Samurai Inc.

Notes

References
＜国立新美術館＞東京・六本木に２１日オープン (Retrieved January 20, 2007)
「国立新美術館」２１日開館 (Retrieved January 20, 2007)

External links

The National Art Center, Tokyo website in English

Art museums established in 2007
Buildings and structures in Minato, Tokyo
Art museums and galleries in Tokyo
National museums of Japan
Modern art museums in Japan
2007 establishments in Japan
Kisho Kurokawa buildings